Draped Up & Chipped Out, Vol. 3 is a compilation album by American rapper Messy Marv, released on December 9, 2008. It peaked at #50 on the R&B/Hip-Hop Albums chart, #27 on the Heatseekers Albums chart, and #16 on the Heatseekers Albums chart. It is the third, and most successful, album of his Draped Up & Chipped Out series, and one of the most successful albums of his career. It includes performances by Krizz Kaliko, Tech N9ne, Killer Mike, Capone-N-Noreaga, Sean T, Mistah F.A.B., Jay Rock and Yukmouth, and a guest appearance from Keak da Sneak, among others.

Track listing

References

2008 albums
Messy Marv albums
SMC Recordings albums
Sequel albums